Coaching Corps recruits and trains volunteers from college campuses, local communities and civic organizations who are as passionate about kids as they are about sports. Kids in low-income communities deserve the same benefit from youth sports as middle-class and affluent kids - confidence, self-reliance and teamwork.  Coaching Corps exists in over 43 university campuses across America and has provided 1,600 volunteer coaches to serve over 15,000 kids annually.

Coaching Corps' mission statement is "We improve the health, educational and social outcomes for kids living in struggling communities through the power of service and sports." Volunteers through Coaching Corps build skills through peer coaching and training support and typically provide 1–6 hours per week of service. Coaching Corps sports programs range from traditional sports such as basketball, baseball, soccer, and tennis as well as non-traditional ones.

General program 

Coaching Corp recruits volunteers on university campuses that have shown interest in volunteering in low-income communities.  Volunteers are required to commit to 1–4 hours a week for at least one season. These volunteers then coach  children in a variety of sports and activities in order to promote physical wellness and a positive outlook.

Take your team to college day 

"Take Your Team to College Day" is a university sponsored event that takes 15-20 kids from Coaching Corps programs on a college campus tour, most notably UCLA, Stanford, UC Berkeley, and USC. The primary goal of this event is to inspire the children to think about their futures and higher education.

Notable supporters 

 Tony La Russa 
 Andrew Luck 
 Walter Haas Jr. 
 Cal Athletics 
 Stanford Athletics 
 Matt Kemp

Facts and figures
Information and statistics about Coaching Corps:

Facts
Coaching Corps has served nearly 50,000 kids through 2014.
Kids have had over 700,000 hours of face-to-face time with trained coaches.
There are Coaching Corps chapters across the country that are actively recruiting. 
To date, nearly 3,000 coaches have been recruited and partnered with after school programs.

Figures
Age demographics of youth served:
 75% are in elementary school
 24% are in middle school
 1% are in high school
 65% are male
 35% are female

Ethnicity of youth served:
 African-American - 55%
 Caucasian - 5%
 Hispanic - 15%
 Other - 25%

Household income of Coaching Corps communities:
 20,000-39,000 - 29%
 40,000-59,000 - 31%
 60,000-79,000 - 26%
 80,000+ - 14%

Coaching Corps university chapters 

Coaching Corps has active chapters at the following universities:

Georgia
Emory University

California
California State University Northridge
San Diego State University 
San Francisco State University 
Stanford University 
University of California, Berkeley
University of California, Los Angeles 
University of California, Santa Cruz 
University of San Diego
University of Southern California

References 

Youth organizations based in California